The Fútbol de Primera Player of the Year, formerly known as the Honda Player of the Year, recognizes the best player on the United States Men's National Soccer Team, as chosen by the national sports media.

The award was created by Fútbol de Primera in 1991. Hugo Pérez was the first player to win this award. In order to celebrate the tenth anniversary of this award in 2000, Fútbol de Primera organized a special Honda Player of the Decade Award, which was won by Eric Wynalda. In 2009, Landon Donovan was named Player of the Decade for the 2000s.

Robert M. Garcia, Argentinian-born master jeweler from the San Francisco Bay Area, California, is the artist who created the original one-of-a-kind bronze trophy used for this award. After hand-drawing many possible male soccer players, one was chosen. Then, using a centuries-old bronze sculpture-making technique, the soccer player figure on this unique and beautiful award was created. 

This award should not be confused with the U.S. Soccer Athlete of the Year, given annually by the United States Soccer Federation.

Winners

References

Lists of United States men's international soccer players
American soccer trophies and awards
US Primera
Association football player non-biographical articles